Faith Baptist College and Seminary was a private Baptist-oriented college in Anderson, South Carolina, USA, in the 1990s. It was closed by early 1998. The college offered degrees in religious studies and in minister training. It also offered a few degrees in graduate studies, such as history. It was considered a non-accredited school, as none of the accrediting organizations reviewed it. Any accreditation came from religious organizations.

Faith Baptist College and Semninary was started by Dr. James Bishop in Morgantown, Kentucky, to provide undergraduate studies by correspondence. Upon his death in 1988, the school was transferred to Anderson, South Carolina under the presidency of Dr. Michael A. Smith. Several campus sites were opened with the main site operating as a campus in Pickens, South Carolina, from 1992 to 1995. Satellite campuses also functioned in Dayton (Ohio), Detroit and Asheboro, North Carolina, for several years. In 1995, the schools were transferred to Louisiana and then to California, where due to low enrollment they were subsequently closed. School records are deposited with the Whitefield Theological Seminary in Florida.

References

Bible colleges
Seminaries and theological colleges in South Carolina
Education in Anderson County, South Carolina